Fern Kinney (born Fern Kinney-Lewis, July 11, 1949) is an American R&B and disco singer, who is best remembered for her releases, "Groove Me" and "Together We Are Beautiful".

Career
Born in Jackson, Mississippi, United States, Kinney originally sang in The Poppies with Dorothy Moore.

In the early 1970s, she began working as a session musician and backing vocalist. Among the songs she sang on were King Floyd's "Groove Me", and her former "Poppie" bandmate Dorothy Moore's 1976 Top 10 single, "Misty Blue".

By 1979, then having settled as a housewife, Kinney decided to attempt a comeback, and she recorded her own version of "Groove Me", but changed the rhythm on the song to turn it into a disco dance track.  The song reached number 6 on the Billboard dance chart. Her next single "Together We Are Beautiful", released in 1980 was another disco song, but with a slower and more sultry beat.  It had been recorded by the British vocalist, Steve Allan, eighteen months earlier. Kinney's effort failed to chart in the United States, but reached number one in the UK Singles Chart.

Kinney's subsequent releases attempted to continue in the disco style, however by this time the disco fad had reached its peak and Kinney was unable to repeat her success. By 1983, she had returned to her earlier career as a backing vocalist. In 1994, Music Club released an album (MCCD 167) of Kinney's records called Chemistry The Best Of under the licence from Malaco Records, which contained 17 tracks.

Discography

Albums
Groove Me (1979) - AUS No. 86
Fern (1981)
Sweet Music (1982)

Compilation albums
Fern Kinney (1988)
Chemistry – The Best of Fern Kinney (1994)

Singles

See also
 List of artists who reached number one on the UK Singles Chart
 List of disco artists (F-K)
 List of number-one singles from the 1980s (UK)
 List of one-hit wonders on the UK Singles Chart
 List of performers on Top of the Pops
 List of people from Mississippi

References

External links
 

1949 births
Living people
Musicians from Jackson, Mississippi
American women pop singers
American rhythm and blues singers
American disco musicians
21st-century American women